Julius Joseph may refer to:

Julius Joseph (spy), American government official
Julius Joseph (basketball) (born 1975), British basketball player